Edmund John Fowler VC (1861 – 26 March 1926) was an Irish recipient of the Victoria Cross, the highest and most prestigious award for gallantry in the face of the enemy that can be awarded to British and Commonwealth forces.

Born in County Waterford, he later achieved the rank of Colour-Sergeant. He died in Colchester, Essex, on 26 March 1926.

Details
He was around 18 years old, and a Private in the 2nd Battalion, 90th Regiment of Foot (Perthshire Volunteers), British Army during the Zulu War when the following deed took place for which he was awarded the VC.

On 28 March 1879 at the Battle of Hlobane, South Africa, Private Fowler, with a captain and a lieutenant (Henry Lysons) dashed forward in advance of the party which had been ordered to dislodge the enemy from a commanding position in natural caves up the mountain. The path was so narrow that they had to advance in single file and the captain who arrived first at the mouth of the cave was instantly killed. The lieutenant and Private Fowler undismayed by the death of their leader, immediately sprang forward and cleared the enemy out of their stronghold.

The medal
His Victoria Cross is displayed at the Cameronians Regimental Museum in the Hamilton Low Parks Museum in Hamilton, Lanarkshire, Scotland.

References

 The Register of the Victoria Cross (1981, 1988 and 1997)

 Ireland's VCs (Dept of Economic Development, 1995)
 Monuments to Courage (David Harvey, 1999)
 Irish Winners of the Victoria Cross (Richard Doherty & David Truesdale, 2000)

External links
 Location of grave and VC medal (Essex)
 Camulos

1861 births
1926 deaths
Royal Irish Regiment (1684–1922) soldiers
Irish recipients of the Victoria Cross
Cameronians soldiers
People from County Waterford
Anglo-Zulu War recipients of the Victoria Cross
British Army personnel of the Anglo-Zulu War
British Army recipients of the Victoria Cross
British Army personnel of the Anglo-Egyptian War
Burials in Essex
Military personnel from County Waterford